The Nagpur riots of 1927 were part of series of riots taking place across various cities in British India during the 1920s. Nagpur was then the capital of Central Provinces and Berar (CP&B) state of British India which covered most of the central India. The riots occurred on 4 September 1927. On that day, there was a procession for Mahalakshmi, which was blocked by Muslims when it came to the Mahal neighbourhood. In the afternoon, there was rioting near the Hindu houses of the neighbourhood, which continued for three days.

Background

The mutual trust between Hindu and Muslim communities had reached a low in the 1920s, and riots were seen frequently across many cities of India. In 1923, India witnessed eleven riots, in 1924 there were eighteen riots, in 1925 there were sixteen riots, and in 1926 there were thirty five riots. In the twelve months from May 1926 to April 1926, 40 more riots occurred across various cities. They mostly occurred in Bengal, Punjab, North-West Frontier Province and United Provinces. 

Lahore riots of August 1927 were the most deadly recorded riots in this series.

The earlier riot of 1923 was caused when the members of Hindu Mahasabha took out a procession and passed in front of a mosque, playing loud music. The Muslim community objected, starting a skirmish between the two parties. These riots had a profound impact on K. B. Hedgewar, prompting him to form, in 1925, the Rashtriya Swayamsevak Sangh (RSS), a Hindu nationalist organization and one of the largest Hindu organizations in the world. Christophe Jaffrelot in his book The Hindu Nationalist Movement and Indian Politics records a testimony saying that Hedgewar led the Ganesha procession in 1927, beating the drums in defiance of the usual practice not to pass in front of the mosque with music. All these events acted as a catalyst building up the tensions between two communities.

Riots
On the morning of 4 September, the day of Lakshmi Puja, Hindus took out a procession like every year, and passed in front of a mosque in the Mahal area of Nagpur. However, the Muslims stopped the procession this time around and did not allow it to pass through the area. In the afternoon, when the Hindus were resting after the morning procession, Muslim youths took out a procession shouting Allahu Akbar, armed with weapons like javelins, daggers and knives. 

Muslim youths threw stones at the house of Hedgewar, who was then away from Nagpur. RSS cadres, sensing the mood of the procession, came out in the narrow lanes of the Mahal area and reciprocated with lathis, further intensifying the riots. Liaquat Ali Khan, in his book Pakistan – The Heart of Asia, also describes a major arson incident during the riot that seemed pre-meditated with explosives gathered well before the riots began. 

The Washington Post reported 22 had been killed and more than 100 injured in riots that continued for two days.

Later, the government ordered troops into the city to restore peace. During the riots, the RSS had grouped its cadres in 16 shakhas, spread out across the city to protect the Hindu communities.

Aftermath
Many Hindu homes and temples had been vandalized and Hindus had also been killed in large numbers including 13 RSS members who were lynched by a furious Muslim mob. RSS had showcased its role in defending Hindus during the riots. The popularity of the organization grew as the news of the incident spread across the country, and it saw a spurt in its membership. By 1929, the organization formed an elaborate hierarchical structure. Between 1931–1939, the number of its branches grew from 60 to 500. The membership count had reached 60,000 by this time.

References

History of Nagpur
Riots and civil disorder in India
Rashtriya Swayamsevak Sangh
Nagpur riots
Nagpur
Crime in Maharashtra
Nagpur riots